Noxon Rapids Dam is an earthfill gravity-type hydroelectric dam on the Clark Fork river, in the northwest part of the U.S. state of Montana.

The dam is located in the far northwest of Montana near the Idaho border. Downriver of Noxon Rapids Dam the Clark Fork is again impounded by the Cabinet Gorge Dam.

The operating capacity of Noxon Rapids Dam at full turbine flow and full pool is 527 MW.  The project is owned and operated by Avista.

See also

List of dams in the Columbia River watershed

References

External links
Historic American Engineering Record (HAER) documentation, filed under South Bank of Clark Fork River at Noxon Rapids, Noxon, Sanders County, MT:

Dams in Montana
United States power company dams
Historic American Engineering Record in Montana
Hydroelectric power plants in Montana
Buildings and structures in Sanders County, Montana
Dams completed in 1959
Energy infrastructure completed in 1959
Dams on the Clark Fork
Earth-filled dams
1959 establishments in Montana